Zhang Han (died July 205 BC) was a Chinese military general of the Qin dynasty. When uprisings erupted throughout China during the reign of Qin Er Shi, Zhang Han led the Qin armies and successfully quelled several of these rebel forces. In 207 BC, Zhang Han was defeated by Xiang Yu of Chu at the Battle of Julu, after which he surrendered along with his 200,000 troops. He was conferred the title "King of Yong" (雍王) by Xiang Yu and given part of the lands in Guanzhong as his fief when Xiang split the former Qin Empire into the Eighteen Kingdoms after the fall of the Qin dynasty. Zhang Han's territory was conquered by Liu Bang in 206 BC, and he committed suicide a year later.

Life
In 209 BC, the rebel army led by Chen Sheng's deputy, Zhou Wen (周文), was the first to reach the Qin capital Xianyang. Qin Er Shi was shocked and discussed with his subjects how to counter the rebels. Zhang Han suggested to the emperor to grant amnesty to some of the convicts serving as labourers at Qin Shi Huang's mausoleum, and organise them into an army to deal with the rebels. The emperor approved Zhang Han's proposal and put him in charge of the army to quell the rebel forces. Zhang Han emerged victorious against Zhou Wen, defeating and driving Zhou out of Guanzhong. The emperor then commissioned Sima Xin and Dong Yi to serve as Zhang Han's deputies.

Zhang Han's army continued to advance eastward and destroyed the rebel army of Chen Sheng. Zhang Han then led his men to attack the Wei rebels, emerging victorious against Wei and enemy reinforcements from Qi. Zhang Han's armies moved on to attack Tian Rong (田榮) of Qi, while Xiang Liang of Chu came to help Qi and defeated Zhang. Zhang Han scored another victory at the Battle of Dingtao against the Chu forces, killing Xiang Liang in battle.

In 207 BC, when Zhang Han attacked and besieged the Zhao forces at Julu, the Zhao ruler Zhao Xie (趙歇) sought help from King Huai II of Chu. King Huai II sent Xiang Yu to lift the siege and Xiang's army defeated Zhang Han's forces at the Battle of Julu despite being heavily outnumbered. Zhang Han sent Sima Xin to request for reinforcements from Xianyang but Zhao Gao deceived Qin Er Shi and the emperor refused to send aid. Sima Xin escaped from Zhao Gao's assassins on his return journey and reported to Zhang Han that the state power of Qin had fallen into the hands of Zhao. Zhang Han pondered over the situation and realised that he would not survive even if he attained victory over Xiang Yu, as Zhao Gao would have him killed on false charges of treason. Hence, Zhang Han and his 200,000 troops then surrendered to Xiang Yu and Zhang was conferred the title of "King of Yong" (雍王) by Xiang.

After the fall of the Qin Dynasty in 206 BC, Xiang Yu divided the former Qin Empire into the Eighteen Kingdoms, while Zhang Han and his two deputies were granted the region of Guanzhong as their fiefs. The three kingdoms were known as the Three Qins because they occupied the lands of the former Qin state. Later that year, the forces of Liu Bang (King of Han) invaded Guanzhong and captured Zhang Han's territory in a surprise attack. Zhang Han retreated to Feiqiu (廢丘; present-day Xingping, Shaanxi) and remained there. A year later, in July 205 BC, the Han army flooded Feiqiu and Zhang Han committed suicide after his defeat.

References

General references
 Sima Qian. Records of the Grand Historian, volumes 7, 8.
 Ban Gu et al. Book of Han, volumes 1, 31.

Year of birth unknown
205 BC deaths
Chinese military personnel who committed suicide
Chu–Han contention people
Qin dynasty generals
Suicides in the Chu–Han contention